Sengaku Mayeda is a Japanese writer, philosopher and teacher, known for his writings on Indian philosophy and Adi Shankara. He was honoured by the Government of India, in 2014, by bestowing on him the Padma Shri, the fourth highest civilian award, for his services to the fields of literature and education. He is the fourth Japanese to be honoured with Padma Shri, after Taro Nakayama, Shoji Shiba and Prof. Noboru Karashima. He is also a recipient of the Third Order of Merit with the Middle Cordon of the Rising Sun of the Government of Japan, which he received in 2002.

Biography

Sengaku Mayeda was born on 1 April 1931 at Nagoya, in the prefecture of Aichi, in Japan. He did his pre graduate studies at the College of General Education, in Tokyo and graduated with BA from the Department of Indian Philosophy and Buddhist Studies, Faculty of Letters, University of Tokyo, in 1955. He continued his post graduate studies at the University of Tokyo and secured his MA from the Department of Indian Philosophy, Division of Humanities, in 1957.

His doctoral research was at the same school at the University of Tokyo and obtained a doctorate degree in 1962. This was followed by a doctoral degree, Doctor of Philosophy, from the University of Pennsylvania, under Professor W. Norman Brown in Rigveda and Sanskrit, in the same year and, later, Doctor of Literature from University of Tokyo in 1973.

In 1961, Sengaku Mayeda got the Harrison Research Fellow from University of Pennsylvania. A year later, he got the Faculty Research Fellowship of the American Institute of Indian Studies of University of Madras where he had the opportunity to associate with the noted philosopher, T. M. P. Mahadevan. The next year, he got the Alexander von Humboldt-Stiftung fellowship and worked along with Prof. Paul Hacker at the University of Münster, West Germany.

Mayeda started his teaching career in 1964, joining the University of Pennsylvania as the Assistant Professor of Indian Philosophy. In 1968, he returned to Japan and to research as the Director of the Research Division of Suzuki Research Foundation in Tokyo where he worked till 1973. The next assignment was again at teaching, as the Assistant Professor of Indian Philosophy at University of Tokyo, and he retired as the Professor in 1991.

After retirement from the Tokyo University, Mayeda was offered the post of the Professor of Indian Philosophy at Musashino Women's University. Three years later, he became the Vice President and worked there till 1998. He continued as the Professor at the University till 2001 when he gave up on regular teaching.

Sengaku Mayeda has held many important posts related to Philosophy and Indo Japanese relations. He has been a Director of the Indo-Japanese Association since 1983, a post he still holds. He was the President of the Japanese Association of Indian and Buddhist Studies for two terms, first from 1991 to 1995 and then from 1998 till 2002. He was the Chairman of the Graduate School of Human and Cultural Studies at the Musashino Women's University from 1999 to 2001. He has also served as a member of the Steering Committee of Japan-India Friendship Year of the Japanese Ministry of Foreign Affairs. He also worked as a member of the Steering Committee of the Federation Internationale des Societies Philosophie during the period from 2003 to 2008.

Sengaku Mayeda presently holds the posts of the Executive Director of the Eastern Institute, founded by Hajime Nakamura, the Chairman of Japan-India Academic Exchange in Humanities and Social Sciences and the President of the Ashikaga Gakko, Ashikaga.

Publications
Sengaku Mayeda has written extensively about Adi Shakara and the Indian philosophies, by way of published books and articles. Among them, Thousand Teachings: The Upadesasahasri of Sankara, in two volumes, is counted as his masterpiece. The book is a critical study of 27 poetic and 11 prose manuscripts, translated into English by the author.

Some of Mayeda's publications are:

Book-author
 
 
 
Book-editor
 
 
Articles
 
 

He has also been a prolific writer of articles which have been published in many journals of international repute and regularly gives lectures on the subject.

Positions held
Mayeda is the Professor Emeritus, University of Tokyo and Musashino University. He has held, during his career, various positions of importance.
 President - Ashikaga Gakko, Ashikaga
 Director - Japanese Association of Indian and Buddhist Studies
 Director - Association of Buddhist Thought
 Councilor - Japanese Association of Religious Studies
 Chairman - Editorial Committee of the English Tripitaka
 Chairman - Society for the Promotion of Buddhism
 President - Nakamura Hajime Eastern Institute, Tokyo
 Director - Nakamura Hajime Memorial Hall, Matsue, Shimane Prefecture
 Advisor - Indo-Japanese Association
 Director - Indo-Japanese Association
 Special Advisor of the Sanin-India Association and Buddhist Studies

Awards and recognitions
 Padma Shri - Government of India - 2014
 Third Order of Merit with the Middle Cordon of the Rising Sun - Government of Japan - 2002
 Buddhagunupakan Kancanakiartigun – Highest Decoration of Excellence - House of Representatives, Kingdom of Thailand
 Japanese Association of Indian and Buddhist Studies Award
 Academic Achievement Award - Nakamura Hajime Eastern Institute
 Japan Academy Prize
 Excellent Book Award - Tokyu Kagami Foundation

He is a research fellow of the Chinese Academy of Social Sciences, Beijing, China and is a recipient of Doctorate of Literarture (Honoris Causa) from the Buddhasravaka Bhiksu University, Sri Lanka.

See also

 Adi Shankara
 Advaita Vedanta

References

External links
 
 
 

1931 births
Living people
Recipients of the Padma Shri in literature & education
Japanese writers
Japanese philosophers
Japanese scholars of Buddhism
Advaita Vedanta
People from Nagoya
University of Tokyo alumni
University of Pennsylvania alumni
Academic staff of the University of Tokyo
University of Pennsylvania faculty
Recipients of the Order of the Rising Sun, 3rd class